Ayatollah Sheikh Muhammad-Baqir al-Irawani (1949) is an Iraqi Shia scholar, religious authority, and poet.

al-Irawani is considered as one of the strong nominees for the grand religious authority in Najaf after grand Ayatollah, Sayyid Ali al-Sistani.

Early life and religious career 
al-Irawani was born in Najaf in 1949 to Sheikh Muhammad-Taqi al-Irawani, a descendant of grand Ayatollah Sheikh Muhammad al-Irawani, known as al-Fadhil al-Irawani, who was a student of Sheikh Muhammad-Hasan al-Najafi, and Sheikh Murtadha al-Ansari.

He grew up in Najaf, and completed his primary, and secondary academic studies in the Publication Forum schools that was supervised by a number of scholars, including Sheikh Muhammad-Ridha al-Mothafar.

He then joined the religious seminary in Najaf, and after completing his preliminary studies, went on to study bahth kharij (advanced seminars) under the two grand Ayatollahs, Sayyid Abu al-Qasim al-Khoei, and Sayyid Muhammad-Baqir al-Sadr. He attended the principles of Islamic jurisprudence of Sayyid Ali al-Sistani, and Sayyid Muhammad-Sa'eed al-Hakim.

al-Irawani taught in the Najaf seminary, sutooh 'ulya (advanced intermediate studies) until he emigrated from Iraq.

Towards the end of the Iran-Iraq war, al-Irawani migrated to Qom and continued to teach the sutooh 'ulya. Five years later, he taught principles and jurisprudence in advanced levels, and completed a ten year course.

He returned to Iraq after the US invasion of Iraq, and resided in his hometown, teaching in the Imam Ali shrine, as well as other religious seminaries in Najaf.

Works 
al-Irawani authored a number of books that were transcripts from different classes he attended and taught. These included:

 al-Isloob al-Thani lil Halqa al-Thalitha. Four volumes of explanatory work of Sayyid Muhammad-Baqir Sadrs principles of jurisprudence lessons.
 Durus Tamheediya fi al-Fiqh al-Istidlali. Three volumes of a course on ratiocination in a new method. Considered an alternative to al-Shahid al-Thani's al-Rawḍa al-bahīyya.
 Durus Tamheediya fi al-Qawa'id al-Rijaliya. A series of lectures on the science of narrators.

He also worked on an alternative book to Sheikh al-Ansari's Makasib, and has completed the book of purity, and prayer, and they are taught in the religious seminary's of Qom.

al-Irawani also writes poetry, and some of his poetry includes:

 Karbala Huffat Li Karbin wa Balaa'. A poem commemorating the death anniversary of Imam Husayn.
 Hellel al-Shi'ru fi al-Madeehi wa Kabbar. A poem commemorating the birth anniversary of Fatima Masumah.
 Madarisuna Bakat Limudarisiha. A chronogrammatic poem mourning the passing of Sayyid Muhammad-Kadhim al-ModarresiThe verse in brackets has a numerical value of 1414 (the hijri year for 1994).

See also 

 Hawza Najaf

References

External links 

 Library of al-Irawani's books by al-Feker E-book Network

Living people
1949 births
Iraqi religious leaders
People from Najaf
Shia scholars of Islam
20th-century Iraqi poets
Iraqi people of Iranian descent
21st-century Iraqi poets